Trinidad and Tobago Olympic Committee (IOC code: TTO) is the National Olympic Committee representing Trinidad and Tobago. It is also the body responsible for Trinidad and Tobago's representation at the Commonwealth Games.

See also
Trinidad and Tobago at the Olympics
Trinidad and Tobago at the Commonwealth Games

References

External links
 
 Trinidad and Tobago Olympic Committee

Trinidad and Tobago
Trinidad and Tobago
Olympic
Trinidad and Tobago at the Olympics
1946 establishments in Trinidad and Tobago
Sports organizations established in 1946